Antsakoamanondro is a municipality in Madagascar. It belongs to the district of Ambanja, which is a part of Diana Region. According to 2001 census the population of Antsakoamanondro was 5,622.

Primary and junior level secondary education are available in town. The majority 98% of the population are farmers.  The most important crop is rice, while other important products are coffee, seeds of catechu and oranges.  Services provide employment for 0.02% of the population and fishing employs 1.98% of the population.

In the village of Antetezambato that is part of this municipality, there are imporant demantoid and amethyst mines.

References

Populated places in Diana Region